is a Japanese footballer who plays as a midfielder for Philippines Football League side Stallion Laguna.

Career statistics
Updated to 2 February 2018.

References

External links
Profile at Grulla Morioka

1990 births
Living people
Association football people from Iwate Prefecture
Japanese footballers
J1 League players
J2 League players
J3 League players
Urawa Red Diamonds players
Thespakusatsu Gunma players
Iwate Grulla Morioka players
Association football midfielders
Naturalized citizens of Japan
Japanese people of Korean descent